A coucal is one of about 30 species of birds in the cuckoo family. All of them belong in the subfamily Centropodinae and the genus Centropus. Unlike many Old World cuckoos, coucals are not brood parasites, though they do have their own reproductive peculiarity: all members of the genus are (to varying degrees) sex-role reversed, so that the smaller male provides most of the parental care. Male pheasant coucals  (Centropus phasianinus) invest in building the nest, incubate for the most part and take a major role in feeding the young. At least one coucal species, the black coucal, is polyandrous.

Taxonomy
The genus Centropus was introduced in 1811 by the German zoologist Johann Karl Wilhelm Illiger. The type species was subsequently designated as the Senegal coucal by George Robert Gray in 1840. The genus name combines the Ancient Greek kentron meaning "spur" or "spike" with pous meaning "foot".

Description
Many coucals have a long claw on their hind toe (hallux). The feet have minute spurs and this is responsible for the German term for coucals Sporenkuckucke. The common name is perhaps derived from the French coucou and alouette (for the long lark like claw). (Cuvier, in Newton 1896) The length of the claw can be about 68-76% of the tarsus length in the African black coucal C. grillii and lesser coucal C. bengalensis. Only the short-toed coucal C. rectunguis is an exception with the hallux claw of only 23% of the tarsus length. Thread like feather structures (elongated sheaths of the growing feathers that are sometimes termed trichoptiles) are found on the head and neck of hatchlings and can be as long as 20mm. Nestlings can look spiny. Many are opportunistic predators, Centropus phasianus is known to attack birds caught in mist nets while white-browed coucals Centropus superciliosus are attracted to smoke from grass fires where they forage for insects and small mammals escaping from the fire.

Coucals generally make nests inside dense vegetation and they usually have the top covered but some species have the top open. Pheasant coucal Centropus phasianinus, greater coucal C. sinensis and Madagascar coucal C. toulou sometimes build an open nest while some species always build open nests (the bay coucal C. celebensis)

Some coucal species have been seen to fly while carrying their young.

Species 
The genus contains 29 species:
 Buff-headed coucal, Centropus milo
 White-necked coucal or pied coucal, Centropus ateralbus
 Ivory-billed coucal or greater black coucal, Centropus menbeki
 Biak coucal, Centropus chalybeus
 Rufous coucal, Centropus unirufus
 Green-billed coucal, Centropus chlororhynchos
 Black-faced coucal, Centropus melanops
 Black-hooded coucal, Centropus steerii
 Short-toed coucal, Centropus rectunguis
 Bay coucal, Centropus celebensis
 Gabon coucal, Centropus anselli
 Black-throated coucal, Centropus leucogaster
 Senegal coucal, Centropus senegalensis
 Blue-headed coucal, Centropus monachus
 Coppery-tailed coucal, Centropus cupreicaudus
 White-browed coucal, Centropus superciliosus
 Burchell's coucal, Centropus burchelli
 Sunda coucal, Centropus nigrorufus
 Greater coucal, Centropus sinensis
 Malagasy coucal or Madagascar coucal, Centropus toulou
 Goliath coucal, Centropus goliath
 Black coucal, Centropus grillii
 Philippine coucal, Centropus viridis
 Lesser coucal, Centropus bengalensis
 Violaceous coucal, Centropus violaceus
 Black-billed coucal or lesser black coucal, Centropus bernsteini
 Kai coucal, Centropis spilopterus
 Pheasant coucal, Centropus phasianinus
 Andaman coucal or brown coucal, Centropus andamanensis
A fossil species, Centropus colossus, is known from the Quaternary-aged Fossil Cave, Tantanoola, South Australia.

References